Jack Orchulli (born 1946 in Pennsylvania) is an American former founder and CEO of Michael Kors and former political candidate from Connecticut.

Early education 
Raised in Alpha, New Jersey, he went to Phillipsburg Catholic High School, and then received a degree from Rutgers University.

He later attended night school and received a master's degree in finance from Baruch College in New York City.

Political career 
He is a Darien, Connecticut, resident and was the unsuccessful Republican candidate for the Connecticut seat held by Christopher Dodd in the 2004 U.S. Senate election.

The split with Michael Kors 
Orchulli, previously an independent, became a Republican in August 2003 shortly before launching his bid for the U.S. Senate and ran for office with no prior political experience. Just months before deciding to run for the U.S. Senate, Orchulli sold his family's ownership interest in Michael Kors (a fashion enterprise) in 2003 and announced his retirement from business. Orchulli had started the Michael Kors Company with Kors in 1981 and remained its CEO/partner until he left the company which, then, had a retail sales volume of about $200 million worldwide.

First campaign 
In November 2004, Orchulli garnered 33 percent of the vote as a long-shot standing against incumbent Senator Christopher Dodd, who won his fifth consecutive term for the Democrats with 66 percent of the vote.

Second campaign 
Two years later, Orchulli was considered a possible mid-campaign replacement for Republican U.S. Senate candidate Alan Schlesinger, who had come under media fire for a claim that Schlesinger had gambled in the past under an assumed name at Connecticut casinos. Schlesinger was running for the seat held by U.S. Senator Joe Lieberman in the November 2006 election. However, Jack decided not to pursue a late entry campaign.

In 2006 and 2007, Orchulli, as a newcomer to small-town politics, led the local Darien (CT) Republican Party to its largest defeat in the history of the town's municipal elections. In November 2007, in the town where Republicans outnumber Democrats 3 to 1, Orchulli and the Republicans lost control of the Board of Selectmen to the Democrats by a vote of 65% to 35%, unprecedented for the town and mirroring Orchulli's 66% to 32% defeat by Dodd three years earlier

Chairmanship 
He was the state Republican Party finance chair in 2007. In addition, he was a board member of the Connecticut Development Corporation for over three years, a quasi-state government organization which looks to retain and grow jobs in the state.

Third campaign 
On May 22, 2010, Orchulli was nominated to be the Republican candidate for State Comptroller, the post being vacated by incumbent Democrat Nancy Wyman. Orchulli went on to lose the general election to Democrat Kevin Lembo, receiving 43% of the vote.

In November 2012, Orchulli was quoted as saying about a fellow unsuccessful candidate for the senate, Linda McMahon's decision to align herself with Obama that it "showed, from my perspective, a sense of desperation."

Fourth campaign 
In 2016, Orchulli sought the Republican nomination to run for U.S. Senate against the incumbent Democrat Richard Blumenthal. He placed third at the state Republican convention on May 9 and urged his delegates to support party nominee Dan Carter.

Private life 
He has one son, Andrew, who resides in New York City.

References

External links
 Official site of Orchulli's 2014 state campaign
 New York Times: In Connecticut, Dodd Easily Tops Orchulli for 5th Senate Term, November 3, 2004
 2004 Senate campaign financial summary from OpenSecrets.org

Connecticut Republicans
American people of Italian descent
Baruch College alumni
People from Alpha, New Jersey
People from Darien, Connecticut
1946 births
Living people
Rutgers University alumni
Candidates in the 2004 United States elections